Pontevedra Railway Station is a railway station of the Spanish Atlantic Axis high-speed rail line which provides services to the city of Pontevedra, in Galicia, Spain.

Location
The station is located at the end of the Estación Avenue, next to the Portuguese Way in the neighbourhood of O Gorgullón, in the south of the city. There is also a stopping place in the north of the city, called Pontevedra Universidad.

History 
The Pontevedra station passenger building is a two-floor structure with an elongated, rectangular plan, clad in stone and adorned in its main entrance with an arch in a triangular pediment. It was inaugurated on 8 August 1966. It is located in the south-east of the city near the Gafos River, where the station was transferred to replace the old central station in the Campolongo district.

On 30 November 2000, the Vialia shopping centre opened in the station annex, where there are also 8 cinemas.

Between 2013 and 2015, Pontevedra railway station underwent an overhaul of its track plan: all platforms and tracks were demolished while three new platforms and a new track bundle with two central through tracks and 5 tracks with a platform were built. A huge underground passage has been made to replace the old one, which is now transformed into a service gallery. Glass lifts were installed in all three platforms and pre-installation for 6 escalators was carried out, finally only two escalators were installed to go up to the 2 most used platforms.

Services 
The station has long and medium distance services operated by Renfe on the Atlantic Axis high-speed rail line. It is also served by Avant services marketed as Media Distancia and Cercanías peri-urban (previously Media Distancia).

It also receives freight trains, many of them to the port of Marín and Ria de Pontevedra since 10 July 2002.

The Vialia shopping center has eight cinemas with 1,488 seats. The area of influence is close to 400,000 inhabitants.

There is a taxi stop in front of the station.

Gallery

References

See also

Related articles 
Pontevedra-Universidad railway station
Atlantic Axis high-speed rail line
Pontevedra bus station

External links
 Pontevedra station listing at Adif website
 Official webpage available to buy train tickets and check the timetable

Railway stations in Galicia (Spain)
Railway stations in Spain opened in 1966
Transport in Galicia (Spain)
Buildings and structures in the Province of Pontevedra
Pontevedra
Transport in Pontevedra